Cycloserine, sold under the brand name Seromycin, is a GABA transaminase inhibitor and an antibiotic, used to treat tuberculosis. Specifically it is used, along with other antituberculosis medications, for active drug resistant tuberculosis. It is given by mouth.

Common side effects include allergic reactions, seizures, sleepiness, unsteadiness, and numbness. It is not recommended in people who have kidney failure, epilepsy, depression, or are alcoholics. It is unclear if use during pregnancy is safe for the baby. Cycloserine is similar in structure to the amino acid D-alanine and works by interfering with the formation of the bacteria's cell wall.

Cycloserine was discovered in 1954 from a type of Streptomyces. It is on the World Health Organization's List of Essential Medicines.

Medical uses

Tuberculosis
For the treatment of tuberculosis, cycloserine is classified as a second-line drug. Its use is only considered if one or more first-line drugs cannot be used. Hence, cycloserine is restricted for use only against multiple drug-resistant and extensively drug-resistant strains of M. tuberculosis. Another reason for limited use of this drug is the neurological side effects it causes, since it is able to penetrate into the central nervous system (CNS) and cause headaches, drowsiness, depression, dizziness, vertigo, confusion, paresthesias, dysarthria, hyperirritability, psychosis, convulsions, and shaking (tremors). Overdose of cycloserine may result in paresis, seizures, and coma, while alcohol consumption may increase the risk of seizures. Coadministration of pyridoxine can reduce the incidence of some of these CNS side effects (e.g. convulsions) caused by cycloserine.

Psychiatry
A 2015 Cochrane review found no evidence of benefit in anxiety disorders as of 2015. Another review found preliminary evidence of benefit. Evidence for use in addiction is tentative but also unclear.

Mechanism of action
Cycloserine works as an antibiotic by inhibiting cell-wall biosynthesis in bacteria.  As a cyclic analogue of D-alanine, cycloserine acts against two crucial enzymes important in the cytosolic stages of peptidoglycan synthesis: alanine racemase (Alr) and D-alanine:D-alanine ligase (Ddl). The first enzyme is a pyridoxal 5'-phosphate-dependent enzyme which converts the L-alanine to the D-alanine form.  The second enzyme is involved in joining two of these D-alanine residues together by catalyzing the formation of the ATP-dependent D-alanine-D-alanine dipeptide bond between the resulting D-alanine molecules. If both of these enzymes are inhibited, then D-alanine residues cannot form and previously formed D-alanine molecules cannot be joined together. This effectively leads to inhibition of peptidoglycan synthesis.

Psychiatric use is suggested based on partial NMDA receptor agonism, which improves neural plasticity in lab animals. The degree of clinical usefulness is, as aforementioned, very unclear and still being explored.

Chemical properties
Under mildly acidic conditions, cycloserine hydrolyzes to give hydroxylamine and D-serine.  Cycloserine can be conceptualized as a cyclized version of serine, with an oxidative loss of dihydrogen to form the nitrogen-oxygen bond.

Cycloserine is stable under basic conditions, with the greatest stability at pH = 11.5.

Synthesis 
Initial approaches to synthesize the compound was first published in 1955, when the Stammer group produced a racemic synthesis from ‐β‐aminoxyalanine ethyl ester. In 1957, Platter et al. managed to synthesis the pure D-enantiomer by cyclizing the corresponding α‐amino‐β‐chlorohydroxamic acids. Chemical synthesis of the compound was revolutionized in the 2010s, when several approaches starting with the cheap -serine (mirror form of normal L-serine) were published by different groups.

The biosynthesis of the compound is defined by a ten-gene cluster. -serine and -arginine are converted to O-ureido--serine, flipped to O-ureido--serine, then turned into the final compound by cyclization. In 2013, Uda et al. successfully used recombinant versions of three enzymes in the cluster to produce the compound.

A 1963 patent describes industrial production of the drug by bacterial fermentation. It is unclear what process is used in the 21st century, fermentation, or chemical synthesis.

History
The compound was first isolated nearly simultaneously by two teams. Workers at Merck isolated the compound, which they called oxamycin, from a species of Streptomyces. The same team prepared the molecule synthetically. Workers at Eli Lilly isolated the compound from strains of Streptomyces orchidaceus.  It was shown to hydrolyze to serine and hydroxylamine.

Economics
In the U.S., the price of cycloserine increased from $500 for 30 pills to $10,800 in 2015 after the Chao Center for Industrial Pharmacy and Contract Manufacturing changed ownership to Rodelis Therapeutics in August 2015.

The price increase was rescinded after the previous owner, the Purdue University Research Foundation, which retained "oversight of the manufacturing operation" intervened and Rodelis returned the drug to an NGO of Purdue University. The foundation now will charge $1,050 for 30 capsules, twice what it charged before". Eli Lilly has been criticised for not ensuring that the philanthropic initiative continued. Due to US antitrust laws, however, no company may control the price of a product after it is outlicensed.

Research
Some experimental evidence suggests that D-cycloserine aids in learning by helping form stronger neural connections. It has been investigated as an aid to facilitate exposure therapy in people with PTSD and anxiety disorders, and treatment with schizophrenia. In a clinical trial, a course of D-cycloserine combined with a single dose of ketamine was investigated for treatment resistant bipolar depression. When administered for 8 weeks after a ketamine infusion, cycloserine appeared to potentiate the antidepressant effects in all trial participants.

References

External links 
 

Anti-tuberculosis drugs
World Health Organization essential medicines
Isoxazolidinones
NMDA receptor agonists
GABA transaminase inhibitors
Wikipedia medicine articles ready to translate
Aldols